The FIS Nordic Junior and U23 World Ski Championships 2010 took place in Hinterzarten, Germany from 24 January to 1 February 2010. It was the 33rd Junior World Championships and the 5th Under-23 World Championships in nordic skiing.

Medal summary

Junior events

Cross-country skiing

Nordic Combined

Ski jumping

Under-23 events

Cross-country skiing

Medal table

References 

2010
2010 in cross-country skiing
2010 in ski jumping
Junior World Ski Championships
2010 in youth sport
International sports competitions hosted by Germany